Downtown McAllen is the main business district in McAllen, Texas. U.S. Interstate 2 runs directly south of the downtown area. The City's Central Business District and encompasses the area west of 10th street, east of Bicentennical, south of Hackberry and north of Interstate 2. This area thrives from over 250 retail businesses, the Federal building Bentsen tower, McAllen city Hall, the Mexican Consulate, the Honduran Consulate, the Guatemalan Consulate, Medical offices, banks, the City's Bus Terminal McAllen Central Station and Downtown Parking Garage. It is estimated that 5,516,000 pedestrians visit the Central Business District. The two tallest towers in the area are the Chase Tower and the Bentsen Tower. 17th Street in Downtown is lined with many bars, pubs, lounges, restaurants, and music venues. It is also home to the historic Cine El Rey.

External links
Downtown McAllen

Geography of McAllen, Texas
Geography of Hidalgo County, Texas
McAllen